Camissoniopsis is a plant genus in the evening primrose family (Onagraceae).

Species
 The Plant List recognises 17 taxa (of species and infraspecific names):
 Camissoniopsis bistorta  
 Camissoniopsis cheiranthifolia  
 subsp. suffruticosa  
 Camissoniopsis confusa  
 Camissoniopsis guadalupensis  
 subsp. clementina  
 Camissoniopsis hardhamiae  
 Camissoniopsis hirtella  
 Camissoniopsis ignota  
 Camissoniopsis intermedia  
 Camissoniopsis lewisii  
 Camissoniopsis luciae  
 Camissoniopsis micrantha  
 Camissoniopsis pallida  
 subsp. hallii  
 Camissoniopsis proavita  
 Camissoniopsis robusta

References

 
Onagraceae genera